Omar al-Bayoumi (born ) is a Saudi national linked to two of the 9/11 hijackers in the United States, though he says he simply befriended the pair rather than ran them as agents. Files of the US FBI dating to before the attacks demonstrate that he was a Saudi Arabian intelligence agent. An FBI report declassified in September 2021 lays out evidence that al-Bayoumi had links to known terrorists, provided significant support to 9/11 hijackers Nawaf al-Hazmi and Khalid al-Mihdhar upon their arrival in the US, and communicated with a key logistics facilitator for Osama bin Laden, each time immediately following significant logistics support to Hazmi and Mihdhar. An FBI report declassified in March 2022 lays out evidence that "there is a 50/50 chance [al-Bayoumi] had advanced knowledge the 9/11 attacks were to occur." from the two Islamists he befriended that were involved in plotting 9/11. al-Bayoumi also helped the Islamists find housing in San Diego.

Saudi Arabia claims that al-Bayoumi is not an agent of theirs. According to previously-classified memoranda released by the National Archives in May 2016, as of 6 June 2003, the FBI "believes it is possible that he was an agent of the Saudi Government and that he may have been reporting on the local [Saudi] community to the Saudi Government officials. In addition, during its investigation, the FBI discovered that al-Bayoumi has ties to terrorist elements as well."

Income
Al-Bayoumi was probably born around 1958, but virtually nothing is known of al-Bayoumi's early life. Declassified FBI files describe him as being from an Egyptian family that migrated to Saudi Arabia. Until 1994, he lived in Saudi Arabia, working for the Saudi Ministry of Defense and Aviation, a department headed by Prince Sultan bin Abdul Aziz.

In August 1994, al-Bayoumi moved to the United States and settled in San Diego, California, where he became involved in the local Muslim community. He was perceived as being very inquisitive, and was known to always carry around a video camera. According to several sources, al-Bayoumi was strongly suspected by many residents to be a Saudi government spy. The man the FBI considered their "best source" in San Diego said that al-Bayoumi "must be an intelligence officer for Saudi Arabia or another foreign power," according to Newsweek magazine.

During this time, al-Bayoumi was purportedly a San Diego State University student learning remedial English in the United States as part of a Saudi work-study program. In fact, he only attended the fall, 1994 semester. The Saudi General Authority of Civil Aviation paid al-Bayoumi's salary through a government contractor. When the contractor proposed terminating its relationship with al-Bayoumi in 1999, a Saudi government official replied with a letter marked "extremely urgent" that the government wanted al-Bayoumi's contract renewed "as quickly as possible." As a result, Al-Bayoumi's employment with the project continued.

When interviewed by the FBI in 2003, al-Bayoumi stated he worked for Saudi aviation company Dallah AVCO. Witnesses at Dallah AVCO describe al-Bayoumi as one of 50 "ghost employees" who were paid by the company despite never showing up for work. One witness described al-Bayoumi accruing such outrageous expenses that at one point AVCO refused to pay him.

Al-Bayoumi came to the FBI’s attention in 1998 when his apartment manager reported him receiving packages from the Middle East containing exposed wiring and hosting large gatherings of Middle Eastern men at his residence. In June 1998, an anonymous Saudi philanthropist donated $500,000 to have a Kurdish mosque built in San Diego, on the condition that al-Bayoumi be hired as maintenance manager, with a private office, phone and computer. The donation was accepted, but because al-Bayoumi rarely showed up for work, the mosque's leadership became unhappy with him. Eventually, they fired him.

Some time in late 1999 or early 2000, al-Bayoumi began receiving another monthly payment; this one from Princess Haifa bint Faisal, the wife of Bandar bin Sultan, the Saudi ambassador to the U.S. Cheques for between $2,000 and $3,000 were sent monthly from the princess, through two or three intermediaries, to al-Bayoumi. The payments continued for several years, totalling between $50,000 and $75,000. According to the documents of the 2002 congressional inquiry into the September 11 attacks, al-Bayoumi was not the direct recipient of the checks; Osama Bassnan's wife was. Bassnan was a close associate of al-Bayoumi, and commented to an FBI source "that he did more for the hijackers than al-Bayoumi did." The report further states that, although the money was ostensibly meant for Bassnan, al-Bayoumi's wife had attempted to deposit three of the cheques into her own account.

Al-Hazmi and al-Mihdhar
On 15 January 2000, after attending the 2000 Al Qaeda Summit in Kuala Lumpur, Malaysia, future 9/11 hijackers Nawaf al-Hazmi and Khalid al-Mihdhar flew from Bangkok, Thailand to Los Angeles, California. Al-Bayoumi reportedly helped these two hijackers to settle in the United States, eventually finding them housing in the neighborhood where he resided. During the period that he did so, his salary greatly increased.

The final 9/11 Commission Report noted:

Hazmi and Mihdhar were ill-prepared for a mission in the United States. ... Neither had spent any substantial time in the West, and neither spoke much, if any, English. It would therefore be plausible that they or [Khalid Sheikh Mohammed] would have tried to identify, in advance, a friendly contact for them in the United States. ... We believe it unlikely that Hazmi and Mihdhar ... would have come to the United States without arranging to receive assistance from one or more individuals informed in advance of their arrival."

After they landed, Al-Bayoumi met them at a restaurant. He invited them to move to San Diego with him, where he found them an apartment, co-signed the lease, and advanced them $1,500 to help pay for their rent. (The 9/11 Commission, however, concluded that "[n]either then nor later did Bayoumi give money to either Hazmi or Mihdhar.") Al-Bayoumi also helped them obtain driver's licenses, rides to the Social Security office, and information on flight schools. While they lived across the street from al-Bayoumi, they had no furniture, they constantly played flight simulator games, and limousines picked them up for short rides in the middle of the night. Their neighbors later said they perceived them as strange. They later moved into the house of Abdussattar Shaikh, a friend of al-Bayoumi's, who was secretly working as an FBI informant at the time.

An October 2012 FBI report (declassified several years after it was written) named Fahad al-Thumairy, a Saudi Islamic Affairs official and King Fahd Mosque imam, as having worked with al-Bayoumi. The report also named a third man, Mussaed Ahmed al-Jarrah, who allegedly had ordered al-Bayoumi and al-Thumairy to assist the hijackers; this man's name was not declassified, but was accidentally revealed when the FBI neglected to redact his name from a document filed in April 2020.

Al-Bayoumi claims he met them by happenstance, was being kind to fellow Muslims in need, and had no idea of their plans. Some FBI officials concluded that al-Bayoumi was an unwitting accomplice of the hijackers. As one explained: "We could not find any contact between him and terrorists, any involvement (with al-Qaeda). There was nothing to indicate he's any different from any of the hundreds of people who had contact with the hijackers, who were unwitting to the fact that they were going to be hijackers. It just wasn't there." But one former top FBI official told Newsweek: "We firmly believed that he had knowledge [of the 9/11 plot] and that his meeting with them that day was more than coincidence."

According to an FBI report from 2016, declassified by President Biden on September 12, 2021, the FBI says al-Thumairy "tasked" al-Bayoumi with providing assistance to the two hijackers. al-Thumairy also told al-Bayoumi that Al-Hazmi and al-Mihdhar were, "two very significant people," more than a year before the attacks. The report goes on to state that despite al-Bayoumi's characterization of the meeting with the two hijackers as coincidental, "Caisin Bin Don", a US citizen formerly known as Clayton Morgan, reported al-Bayoumi waiting by the window for the hijackers to arrive, and had a lengthy conversation with them in Arabic. Another witness reports al-Bayoumi was often saying the Islamic community needs to "take action" and that the community was "at jihad."

Arrest and release
In July 2001, Omar al-Bayoumi moved to England to pursue a PhD at Aston University. Ten days after the September 11 attacks he was arrested by British authorities working with the FBI. He was held on an immigration charge while the FBI and Scotland Yard investigated him. According to an FBI report from 2016, declassified in 2021, they found phone numbers linked to a known Tier 1 Terrorist Support Entity as well as numbers associated with the spiritual advisor to Osama bin Laden and Abu Zubaydah. Most directly, the phone number of Mutaib A Al-Sudairy, roommate of a key bin Laden logistics facilitator, Ziyad Khaleel, was found in his phone. Bayoumi called this number 5 times, each call coinciding with significant logistic support of the hijackers. Specifically, on January 24–30, 2000 in the days before he first met the hijackers, the day immediately after Bayoumi met the hijackers in February 2000, and on February 7, 2000 immediately after Hazmi and Midhar's apartment lease and living arrangements had been finalized and funds fronted by Bayoumi. Within two months, Sudairy is recorded at an address in Falls Church, Virginia, the same area where Hazmi, Midhar, Aulaqi, and Hani Hanjour established residence later in the evolution of the 9/11 plot. After interrogation, he was released and went back to studying at Aston, before later moving to Saudi Arabia.

When interrogators asked Khalid Sheikh Mohammed, the mastermind of the 9/11 attacks, whether he knew al-Bayoumi, he said that he did not.

The issue was reopened when the potential links between al-Bayoumi and the Saudi Embassy were reported in the press. Under pressure from Congress, the FBI re-examined the case. They concluded that the allegations were "without merit," and they "abandoned further investigation." However, contemporary news accounts reported that "countless intelligence leads that might help solve [the case] appear to have been under investigated or completely overlooked by the FBI."

The final 9/11 Commission reports stated "we have seen no credible evidence that he believed in violent extremism, or knowingly aided extremist groups." Despite this, the FBI reached a much different conclusion in 2016 during Operation Encore. In a report, declassified on September 12, 2021, FBI agents stated that Fahad al-Thumairy "tasked" al-Bayoumi with assisting the two hijackers upon their arrival in Los Angeles, and said they were, "two very significant people," more than a year before the attacks. Rather than the chance meeting al-Bayoumi previously described to investigators, in which al-Bayoumi was seen with al-Hazmi and al-Mihdhar at a restaurant, a witness told the FBI that al-Bayoumi had been waiting at the window for their arrival, and had a lengthy conversation with them. The report says a woman told investigators that al-Bayoumi was often saying the Islamic community needs to "take action," and that the community was, "at jihad." This directly contradicts the findings of the 9/11 Commission Report and its conclusion he did not knowingly aid extremist groups.

Per previously-classified memoranda released by the National Archives in May 2016, as of 6 June 2003, "the FBI "believes it is possible that he was an agent of the Saudi Government and that he may have been reporting on the local community to the Saudi Government officials. In addition, during its investigation, the FBI discovered that al-Bayoumi has ties to terrorist elements as well."

In March 2022, the FBI declassified a 510 page report about 9/11 that it produced in 2017. The report found that "there is a 50/50 chance [al-Bayoumi] had advanced knowledge the 9/11 attacks were to occur." from the two Islamists he befriended that were involved in plotting 9/11. al-Bayoumi also helped the Islamists find housing in San Diego. In response, 9/11 Commission chairman and former New Jersey governor Tom Kean said that "If that's true I'd be upset by it", adding "The FBI said it wasn't withholding anything and we believed them."

References

External links
 The Final 9/11 Commission Report
 Statement from the Saudi Embassy

1950s births
Living people
Saudi Arabian expatriates in the United Kingdom
Saudi Arabian expatriates in the United States
People associated with the September 11 attacks
Alumni of Aston University
Place of birth missing (living people)
Year of birth missing (living people)